Songs from Wasties Orchard is a 1971 studio album released by Magna Carta on Vertigo Records. It features Davey Johnstone, vocals, acoustic guitars, electric guitars, mandolin, sitar, harpsichord & cymbals; Chris Simpson, vocals, acoustic guitar & percussion; Glen Stewart, vocals, lyre & wine glass.

Track listing

Side 1
The Bridge at Knaresborough Town
White Snow Dove
Parliament Hill
Wayfarin'
Down Along Up
Country Jam

Side 2
Time for the Leaving
Isle of Skye
Sponge
Sunday on the River
Good Morning Sun
Home Groan

See also
1971 in music

External links

 

1971 albums
Albums produced by Gus Dudgeon
Albums recorded at Trident Studios
Vertigo Records albums